Jean Zimmer (born 6 December 1993) is a German professional footballer who plays as a right-back for 1. FC Kaiserslautern.

Career
Zimmer made his 2. Bundesliga debut on 23 December 2013 in 1. FC Kaiserslautern's 1–2 away win against FC Ingolstadt.

For the 2016–17 season Zimmer moved to VfB Stuttgart. In his first season at the club, he made 16 2. Bundesliga appearances and one in the DFB Pokal.

In August 2017, he joined Fortuna Düsseldorf on loan for the season. On 18 May 2018, Zimmer moved permanently to Düsseldorf.

References

External links
 
 

1993 births
Living people
People from Bad Dürkheim
Footballers from Rhineland-Palatinate
German footballers
Germany under-21 international footballers
Germany youth international footballers
Association football defenders
Bundesliga players
2. Bundesliga players
3. Liga players
1. FC Kaiserslautern players
1. FC Kaiserslautern II players
VfB Stuttgart players
VfB Stuttgart II players
Fortuna Düsseldorf players